Maharashtra State Highway 266 (SH266) is a major state highway in Gondia, in the state of Maharashtra.  This state highway connecting Gondia, Kohamara, Arjuni Morgaon and Wadsa.

Major Junction 

This highway is one of the important highway which directly connected with 
 National Highway 753 (India)
 National Highway 53 (India)
 National Highway 543 (India)
 National Highway 353C (India)

See also 
 List of State Highways in Maharashtra

References 

State Highways in Maharashtra
State Highways in Nagpur District